Memorial Ossuary Mačkov kamen is a memorial monument located near Krupanj, Serbia, which stands on the mountain Jagodnja at an elevation of 923 m (Mačkov kamen – Tomcat's Stone). The remains of fallen soldiers from the First World War are stored inside.

History
The memorial ossuary is located at the top of the Mačkov kamen. Its construction began in 1925. The initiative was launched by the Minister of Construction, Milorad Vujičić. Committee members were Ljuba Jovanović (President of the Assembly), Đorđe Vajfert (Governor of the National Bank), and Dr. Arčibald Rajs and most respected citizens of Rađevina and Azbukovica. The memorial ossuary was designed by architect Momir Korunović and creator Šime Franović and was finally built in 1929. Transfer of the bones of fallen soldiers was organized in August 1931, with permission from the Ministry of the Army.

References

External links

 Republički zavod za zaštitu spomenika kulture – Beograd
 Nepokretna kulturna dobra
 Lista spomenika

Cultural Monuments of Exceptional Importance (Serbia)
Monuments and memorials in Serbia
Serbian culture